Laura Nascimento Amaro (born 27 October 2000) is a Brazilian weightlifter. She won the silver medal in the women's 76kg Snatch event at the 2021 World Weightlifting Championships held in Tashkent, Uzbekistan. She won the silver medal in women's 87kg event at the 2022 South American Games held in Asunción, Paraguay.

She is a two-time bronze medalist at the Pan American Weightlifting Championships.

She also competed in the girls' skeleton event at the 2016 Winter Youth Olympics held in Lillehammer, Norway.

Achievements

References

External links 
 

Living people
2000 births
Place of birth missing (living people)
Brazilian female weightlifters
Pan American Weightlifting Championships medalists
South American Games silver medalists for Brazil
South American Games medalists in weightlifting
Competitors at the 2018 South American Games
Competitors at the 2022 South American Games
Skeleton racers at the 2016 Winter Youth Olympics
21st-century Brazilian women